Ram Karki, (born 16 October 1956) also known as Surendra Kumar Karki, is a Nepali politician belonging to the Communist Party of Nepal (Maoist). As of August 2016 he is the minister for Information and Communications of Nepal.

Personal life and early career
He was born on 14 October 1956, at Rumjatar of Okhaldhunga district. He  remained underground for 10 years during the decade-long insurgency in the country. He has been active in politics for the past 35 years, and held several posts within the Maoist party. He was the party's Chief of International Bureau for many years. He was a nominated MP in the early 2010s,and later Minister for Communication. He is considered an intellectual leader focused on creating modern Maoist party manifestos and interpretations of Marxist theory.  He is married to civil servant Sherap Shenga, who was born and raised in Sikkim, India. Together they have a son and a daughter. These days, he lives in Dhulabari, Jhapa. </ref>

References

External links 
 Information and Communications of Nepal( Native language official website)
 English version of DOI Nepal website
 Ram Karki from CPN Maoist Centre sworn-in

1956 births
Living people
Communist Party of Nepal (Maoist Centre) politicians
People from Okhaldhunga District
Nepal MPs 2017–2022
Nepal Communist Party (NCP) politicians
Members of the 2nd Nepalese Constituent Assembly
Nepali Congress politicians from Koshi Province